Inka Pukara (Aymara Inka Inca, pukara fortress, "Inka fortress", Hispanicized spelling Inca Pucara) is a  mountain in the Andes of Bolivia. It is located in the Oruro Department, Pantaleón Dalence Province, Huanuni Municipality. Inka Pukara lies southeast of Huanuni. The village of Pukara (Pucara) lies at its feet.

References 

Mountains of Oruro Department